Helene Winterstein-Kambersky, née Vierthaler (13 March 1900 in Vienna - 12 June 1966 in the Hinterbrühl) was a singer and inventor of the world's first waterproof mascara.

Helene Winterstein-Kambersky came from an old family of musicians. She was the great-great-granddaughter of the Salzburg composer and founder of the Austrian elementary school system Michael Vierthaler, who studied music with Mozart's father Leopold and Joseph Haydn as well as being the patron of Franz Schubert, to whom he also dedicated an anthem.

Singing career 
Her singing career began in the early twenties of the 20th century. She was a pupil of Lilli Lehmann, the opera singer and singing teacher from Salzburg. Due to her fine and dramaturgically highly developed interpretations of songs by composers such as Mozart, Franz Schubert, Wolf and Pfitzner, she has won numerous prizes in international singing competitions. In 1937 Winterstein-Kambersky was the first woman to sing in front of a darkened audience. Her stage name as a singer was Nussy.

Cosmetics entrepreneur 
In the 1920s, lead poisoning made her dependent on wheelchairs. She invented the world's first waterproof mascara parallel to her singing career. After about two thousand attempts, she made the patented recipe known far beyond the borders of Austria under the name of La Bella Nussy. Winterstein-Kambersky founded a cosmetics company in 1936, which is still family-owned and produces the recipe almost unchanged. Today, its black colour variant consists of water, bleached beeswax, a non-allergenic, mutagenic, carcinogenic or teratogenic hydrocarbon mixture, linseed oil, castor oil and the food colour iron oxide black (E 172). Therefore, unlike the vast majority of mascara commonly used today, it is not an ink but a cream; this means that it does not harden completely after application, which means that the eyelashes retain some of their flexibility. Also the product design is partly based on the historical original, especially tubes with spirals are still sold, which are the forerunners of today's usual round brushes.

A special stamp in honour of Winterstein-Kambersky's inventive and entrepreneurial achievements has been issued by Austrian Post since 2013.

References

External links 
 La Bella Nussy, Webseite der Helene Winterstein Cosmetic GmbH
 derStandard.at - Wie das Internet die Wimperntusche rettete

1900 births
1966 deaths
20th-century Austrian women singers
20th-century Austrian businesswomen
20th-century Austrian businesspeople
Cosmetics businesspeople
Austrian inventors
People from Mödling District